Musica de Camara (Spanish for Chamber music) is a non-profit organization, based in New York, devoted to presenting classical music concerts in and around New York City venues including schools. It has supported more than 125 Hispanic and non-Hispanic classical music musicians since its founding in 1979 by Eva de la O, herself a soprano.

Director
Eva de la O grew up in New York and Puerto Rico and studied at the Juilliard School in Manhattan. She founded Musica de Camara in 1979, wanting in part, to help educate people on Puerto Rican classical music. De la O, who has performed on Broadway is a singer, and teacher of soprano and founded Musica de Camara to showcase Puerto Rican, Caribbean as well as non-Hispanic classical musicians. Her Chamber Music (as it is known in English) was launched at the nearby Museo del Barrio. De la O has worked with the Puerto Rico Symphony Orchestra.

Awards
 National Endowment for the Arts
 Borimix/SEA 
 Comité Noviembre

References

External links
 Official website of Musica de Camara
 2012 Musica de Camara concert flyer

Chamber music groups
Puerto Rican musical groups